Burla is a rural locality (a selo) and the administrative center of Burlinsky District of Altai Krai, Russia. Population:

Geography 
Burla is located near the Burla river.

References

Notes

Sources

Rural localities in Burlinsky District